Mind Games is a 1989 role-playing game supplement published by Hero Games for Champions.

Contents
Mind Games details the evil Parapsychological Studies Institute.

Reception
Mind Games was reviewed in Space Gamer Vol. II No. 2. The reviewer commented that "This has all the psychic psupervillains psuperheroes can swallow. Buy it. Its the best from Hero Games since Strike Force."

Reviews
Dragon #162
Alarums & Excursions (Issue 175 - Mar 1990)

References

Champions (role-playing game) supplements
Role-playing game supplements introduced in 1989